Green Island is a semi-professional association football club in Green Island, Dunedin, New Zealand. They play in the ODT FootballSouth Premier League.
The Green Island Association Football Club was first formed and accepted into the Otago Football Association in 1896 as the Green Island Football club situated at Harroways ground Burnside. Disbanded during the war years and reformed in the late 1940s. The clubrooms were situated at Miller Park until the Abbotsford slip in 1979 forced the club to move to its present site at Sunnyvale.

References
1. UltimateNZSoccer website's Green Island FC page

External links
 Green Island FC Web page

Association football clubs in Dunedin
Sport in Otago
1896 establishments in New Zealand